Lithuanian military ranks and insignia consist of the list and ordering of the different military ranks, for the officers, non-commissioned officers and soldiers of the modern Lithuanian Armed Forces. The ranks are visually represented by insignias placed on the uniforms.

Current

Officers
The rank insignia for commissioned officers for the army, navy and air force respectively.

Enlisted
The rank insignia for enlisted personnel for the army, navy and air force respectively.

Historical

1918 − 1940

1991 − 2012

See also 
 Ranks and insignia of NATO
 List of comparative military ranks

References

External links 
  Lithuanian military rank insignia

 
Ranks